The Lansing–East Lansing Metropolitan Statistical Area is a metropolitan area located in Central Michigan defined by the Office of Management and Budget, and encompassing the counties of Eaton, Clinton, Ingham and Shiawassee. The region is colloquially referred to as "Mid" or Central Michigan, and less often as "Greater Lansing" or the "Capital Area". As of the 2020 census, the MSA had a population of 541,297. It ranks as Michigan's third-largest metropolitan area behind metropolitan Detroit and Grand Rapids.

Description

The metropolitan area was originally defined as only including Ingham County in 1950, but Eaton and Clinton counties were added in 1960. Ionia County was added in 1973, but taken out a decade later for the 1990 Census. Shiawassee County was added in 2018 after commuting flows increased enough for it to qualify as an "outlying county." Shiawassee County was formerly the Owosso μSA.

The Lansing Urban Area, as defined by the U.S. Census Bureau, which measures the extent of the built-up area, had a population of 313,532 as of the 2010 census.

Counties

Lansing–East Lansing MSA
 Eaton County
 Clinton County
 Ingham County
 Shiawassee County

Communities

Cities and Townships with more than 25,000 inhabitants
 Lansing (Principal City)
 East Lansing (Principal City)
 Meridian Charter Township
 Delta Charter Township
 Delhi Charter Township

Cities and Townships with 10,000 to 25,000 inhabitants
 DeWitt Charter Township
 Owosso
 Bath Charter Township

Demographics

2020

As of the census of 2020, there were 541,297 people residing within the MSA. The racial makeup of the MSA was 77.6% White, 8.3% African American, 0.4% Native American, 3.9% Asian, 0.00% Pacific Islander, 2.2% from other races, and 7.3% from two or more races. Hispanic or Latino of any race were 6.8% of the population.

2010

As of the census of 2010, there were 464,036 people, 183,442 households, and 112,131 families residing within the MSA. The racial makeup of the MSA was 81.6% White, 8.9% African American, 0.5% Native American, 3.8% Asian, 0.03% Pacific Islander, 1.9% from other races, and 3.3% from two or more races. Hispanic or Latino of any race were 3.9% of the population.

As of the 2010 American Community Survey estimates, the median income for a household in the MSA was $47,731, and the median income for a family was $60,602. The per capita income for the MSA was $23,359. The region's foreign-born population sat at 7.0%.

See also
 Michigan census statistical areas

References

External links
 Tri-County Regional Planning Commission
 Lansing Regional Chamber of Commerce
 Greater Lansing Convention & Visitors Bureau

 
Central Michigan
Metropolitan areas of Michigan